Meet Corliss Archer is an American radio program from radio's Golden Age that ran from January 7, 1943, to September 30, 1956. Although it was CBS's answer to NBC's A Date with Judy, it was also broadcast by NBC in 1948 as a summer replacement for The Bob Hope Show. From October 3, 1952, to June 26, 1953, it aired on ABC, finally returning to CBS. Despite the program's long run, fewer than 24 episodes are known to exist.

Characters and story
Priscilla Lyon and Janet Waldo successively portrayed 15-year-old Corliss on radio. Lugene Sanders also played Corliss briefly on radio  and in the CBS version of the Meet Corliss Archer television show.

Perpetually perky, breathless and well-intentioned, Corliss is constantly at the side of her next-door neighbor and boyfriend, Dexter Franklin (Bill Christy, Sam Edwards). Clumsy, nerdy Dexter, a sweet but constant bungler with a nasal voice, is best remembered for his trademark phrase, "Holy cow!" and his braying call, "Heyyyy, Corrrrrliiiiiss!"—frequently delivered from the hedge separating their houses.

Harry Archer, Corliss's father, is a lawyer who tolerates Dexter only when he wants to use him to help flaunt male superiority. Gruff but gentle, he was played by Bob Bailey, Fred Shields and Frank Martin. Janet Archer, Corliss's mother, was played by, successively, Irene Tedrow, Monty Margetts and Gloria Holden. She is calm and understanding with her daughter and her husband, both of whom sometimes try her patience.

Other frequent characters include Mildred Ames, a good friend of Corliss (played by Bebe Young and Barbara Whiting); Mildred's irritating younger brother Raymond (Tommy Bernard, Kenny Godkin); and Corliss's rival, Betty Cameron (Delores Crane).

Meet Corliss Archer was written by F. Hugh Herbert, who first introduced the character and her friends in a Good Housekeeping magazine story "A Private Affair," the first of a series of stories. Kiss and Tell was a 1943 play that was adapted for a 1945 film starring Shirley Temple. The 1949 sequel, A Kiss for Corliss, was re-released in 1954.

Television

Herbert's Meet Corliss Archer property was adapted to television in 1951 and 1952 with live broadcasts produced and aired by CBS.  In 1954 and 1955 Ziv Television Programs produced a syndicated telefilm series starring Ann Baker and Mary Brian.  One of the show's unique features was the occasional cut to a comic-book-style drawing, with announcer's commentary, that illustrated the current story situation and was used several times during each episode.  The program was produced by Ziv Productions. Several episodes of the Ziv version are available on DVD, and some are also available from the Internet Archive.

Robin Morgan portrayed Corliss in a live telecast of Kiss and Tell on The Alcoa Hour (August 5, 1956), with Warren Berlinger as Dexter.

Comics
Radio listeners had to use their imaginations to visualize Corliss, her friends and her town. But those imaginations got a boost in 1948 when the Meet Corliss Archer comic book, published by Fox Feature Syndicate, came out in three issues from March to July 1948. Al Feldstein (Albert B. Feldstein), later the editor of Mad, was a key writer and illustrator of this short-lived comic book series, which is now remembered primarily for his artwork in general and the good girl art covers in particular. Film strips and radio microphones on the front cover indicated the tie-ins and media crossovers. Janet Waldo was depicted on the front cover twice, as herself and as Corliss.

Listen to
Jerry Haendiges Listening Lounge: Meet Corliss Archer (April 6, 1947)

References

Sources
A 50-Year Adventure in the Advertising Business by Ernie Baker (Wayne State University Press, 2000)
Meet Corliss Archer at the Grand Comics Database

American comedy radio programs
1940s American radio programs
1950s American radio programs
CBS Radio programs
NBC radio programs
ABC radio programs
Radio programs adapted into television shows